Park Building may refer to:

 Park Building (Cleveland, Ohio), historic commercial building
 Park Building (Worcester, Massachusetts), historic apartment building
 Park Building, the central administration building of the University of Utah
 Park Building, a building of Somerville College, Oxford

See also
 Multi-storey car park